John Sjösvärd (7 May 1890 – 13 December 1958) was a Swedish painter. His work was part of the painting event in the art competition at the 1936 Summer Olympics.

References

1890 births
1958 deaths
20th-century Swedish painters
Swedish male painters
Olympic competitors in art competitions
People from Linköping
20th-century Swedish male artists